Blue Skies Over Dundalk was the first studio album by Mary Prankster.

The title refers to Prankster's hometown of Dundalk, Maryland.

The album was later re-released as Blue Skies Forever, where it was remastered and included the tracks from Prankster's first release, the self-released Mata Hari EP.

Track listing
All songs by Mary Prankster
 "Tits and Whiskey" – 1:39
 "Piss Off" – 1:56
 "Mac and Cheese" – 1:32
 "Blues Skies Over Dundalk" – 1:31
 "Sadie Hawkins Day" – 2:46
 "Breakfast" – 1:45
 "Green Eggs and Hamlet" – 1:20
 "Student Loan" – 1:23
 "Mercyfuck" – 2:48
 "Valentine " – 2:14

Personnel
 Mary Prankster – vocals, guitar
 Mike Lackey – lead guitar
 Cord Neal – bass
 Matt Collorafice – drums
 Steve Wright – engineer

1998 debut albums
Dundalk, Maryland
Fowl Records albums
Mary Prankster albums